Wendy White may refer to:
Wendy White (mezzo-soprano) (born 1953), American opera singer
Wendy White (tennis) (born 1960), American tennis player
Wendy Tan White, British businesswoman
Wendy White (artist) (born 1971), American artist